Pınar Yalçın (born November 7, 1988) is a Turkish-Swedish women's football forward currently playing in the Swedish Women's Football Division 2 for Husie IF. At the same time, she is a member of the Turkey women's national football team since 2013. She is nicknamed "Pinnen" (for "stick" in English) by her fans.

Personal life
Yalçın was born to an immigrant Turkish father, Selman Yalçın, and to an immigrant Turkish mother, Sevdiye Yalçın, in Rosengård district of Malmö in Sweden. She has one sister, Cagla, and two brothers, Serkan and Serhan, who both play football in Malmö.

Playing career

Club
She began playing in the youth team of Malmö FF Dam, which was renamed to LdB FC Malmö in 2007, and then to FC Rosengård in 2013. Yalçın was transferred by the Turkish community club Malmö Anadolu BI.

After playing brief times in the clubs BK Kick, BK Olympic, Kvarnby IK and 1. Dalby GIF, she signed with Husie IF for the 2013–14 season.

In 2013, she was tasked also to officiate women's football matches in other league divisions.

International
Yalçın was called up to take part in the Turkey national team for the 2015 FIFA Women's World Cup qualification round matches. In a newspaper interview, she emphasized that she preferred to play for the Turkey national team. She added that she is happy to make her debut in the match against England women's national football team.

Yalçın capped four times in the Turkey national team competing in the 2015 FIFA Women's World Cup qualification (UEFA) matches.

References

External links
 

1991 births
Footballers from Malmö
Swedish people of Turkish descent
Women's association football forwards
Swedish women's footballers
Swedish football referees
FC Rosengård players
Turkish women's footballers
Turkey women's international footballers
Living people
BK Olympic players
Kvarnby IK players
FC Rosengård 1917 players